Hevein may refer to:
 Hevein (band), a Finnish thrash metal band
 Hevein (protein), a wound-induced protein from Hevea (rubber tree)